Who's Afraid of Virginia Woolf? is a play by Edward Albee first staged in October 1962. It examines the complexities of the marriage of a middle-aged couple, Martha and George. Late one evening, after a university faculty party, they receive an unwitting younger couple, Nick and Honey, as guests, and draw them into their bitter and frustrated relationship.

The play is in three acts, normally taking a little less than three hours to perform, with two 10-minute intermissions. The title is a pun on the song "Who's Afraid of the Big Bad Wolf?" from Walt Disney's Three Little Pigs (1933), substituting the name of the celebrated English author Virginia Woolf. Martha and George repeatedly sing this version of the song throughout the play.

Who's Afraid of Virginia Woolf? won both the 1963 Tony Award for Best Play and the 1962–63 New York Drama Critics' Circle Award for Best Play. It is frequently revived on the modern stage. The film adaptation was released in 1966, written by Ernest Lehman, directed by Mike Nichols, and starring Richard Burton, Elizabeth Taylor, George Segal and Sandy Dennis.

Plot summary

Act One: "Fun and Games"
George and Martha engage in dangerous emotional games. George is an associate professor of history and Martha is the daughter of the president of the college where George teaches. After they return home from a faculty party, Martha reveals she has invited a young married couple she met at the party over for a drink. The guests arrive—Nick, a biology professor (who Martha thinks teaches math), and his wife, Honey. As the four drink, Martha and George engage in scathing verbal abuse of each other in front of Nick and Honey. The younger couple is first embarrassed and later enmeshed. They stay.

Martha taunts George aggressively, and he retaliates with his usual passive aggression. Martha tells an embarrassing story about how she humiliated him with a sucker punch in front of her father. During the telling, George appears with a gun and fires at Martha, but an umbrella pops out of the gun barrel. After this scare, Martha's taunts continue, and George reacts violently by breaking a bottle. Nick and Honey become increasingly unsettled and, at the end of the act, Honey runs to the bathroom to vomit, having had too much to drink.

Act Two: "Walpurgisnacht"
Traditionally, "Walpurgisnacht" is the name of an annual witches' meeting (satiric in the context of the play). Nick and George are sitting outside. As they talk about their wives, Nick says Honey had a "hysterical pregnancy". George tells Nick about a time he went to a gin mill with some boarding school classmates, one of whom had accidentally killed his mother by shooting her. This friend was laughed at for ordering "bergin" (bourbon). The following summer, the friend accidentally killed his father while driving, and he was committed to an asylum and never spoke again. George and Nick discuss the possibility of having children and eventually argue and insult each other. After they rejoin the women in the house, Martha and Nick dance suggestively. Martha also reveals the truth about George's creative writing escapades: he had tried to publish a novel about a boy who accidentally killed both of his parents (with the implication that the deaths were actually murder), but Martha's father would not let it be published. George responds by attacking Martha, but Nick separates them.

George suggests a new game called "Get the Guests". George insults and mocks Honey with an extemporaneous tale of "the Mousie" who "tooted brandy immodestly and spent half her time in the upchuck". Honey realizes that the story is about her and her "hysterical pregnancy". The implication is that she trapped Nick into marrying her because of a false pregnancy. She feels sick and runs to the bathroom again.

At the end of this scene, Martha starts to act seductively toward Nick in George's presence. George pretends to react calmly, reading a book. As Martha and Nick walk upstairs, George throws his book against the door. In all productions until 2005, Honey returns, wondering who rang the doorbell (Martha and Nick had knocked into some bells). George comes up with a plan to tell Martha that their son has died, and the act ends with George eagerly preparing to tell her. In what is labeled the "Definitive Edition" of the script, however, the second act ends before Honey arrives.

Act Three: "The Exorcism"

Exorcism is the expulsion or attempted expulsion of a supposed evil spirit from a person or place. In this act, it seems that Martha and George intend to remove the great desire they have always had for a child by continuing their story of their son and his death.

Martha appears alone in the living room, shouting at the others to come out from hiding. Nick joins her. The doorbell rings: it is George, with a bunch of snapdragons in his hand, calling out, "Flores para los muertos" (flowers for the dead), a reference to the play and movie A Streetcar Named Desire, also about a marriage and outside influences. Martha and George argue about whether the moon is up: George insists it is, while Martha says she saw no moon from the bedroom. This leads to a discussion in which Martha and George insult Nick in tandem, an argument revealing that Nick was too drunk to have sex with Martha upstairs.

George asks Nick to bring Honey back for the final game, "Bringing Up Baby". George and Martha have a son, about whom George has repeatedly told Martha to keep quiet. George talks about Martha's overbearing attitude toward their son. He then prompts her for her "recitation", in which they describe, in a bizarre duet, their son's upbringing. Martha describes their son's beauty and talents and then accuses George of ruining his life. As this segment progresses, George recites sections of the Libera me (part of the Requiem Mass, the Latin mass for the dead).

At the end of the play, George informs Martha that a messenger from Western Union arrived at the door earlier with a telegram saying their son was "killed late in the afternoon...on a country road, with his learner's permit in his pocket" and that he "swerved, to avoid a porcupine". The description matches that of the boy in the gin mill story told earlier. Martha screams, "You can't do that!" and collapses.

It becomes clear to the guests that George and Martha's son is a mutually agreed-upon fiction. The fictional son is a final "game" the two have been playing since discovering early in their marriage that they are infertile. George has decided to "kill" him because Martha broke the game's single rule: never mention the son to others. Overcome with horror and pity, Nick and Honey leave. Martha suggests they could invent a new imaginary child, but George forbids the idea, saying it was time for the game to end. The play ends with George singing, "Who's afraid of Virginia Woolf?" to Martha, whereupon she replies, "I am, George...I am."

Themes

Reality and illusion
Albee has said that the title of the play "means who’s afraid of the big bad wolf … who’s afraid of living life without false illusions." Albee’s interest in the theme of reality versus illusion is expressed in a number of his plays. In discussing Who’s Afraid of Virginia Woolf? he cites Nietzsche’s interpretation of the Apollonian/Dionysian dichotomy of ancient Greek drama, as described in The Birth of Tragedy. Albee says, "There was a time when people believed in deities. And then revolutions came—industrial, French, Freudian, Marxist. God and absolutes vanished. Individuals find this very difficult and uncomfortable. All they have left is fantasy or the examination of the self." According to Lawrence Kingsley, Albee’s characters create illusions to help them evade feelings of their own inadequacy—as "George and Martha have evaded the ugliness of their marriage by taking refuge in illusion.” The play demonstrates "how his characters must rid themselves of falsehood and return to the world in which they must live."

The distinction between truth and illusion is at times deliberately unclear. The existence of the child, the "murder" by George of his parents, or Honey’s "pregnancy" may be illusions, but they still have a reality to the characters. Illusions may be exorcised in the play, but no truth or apparent reality is supplied in its place. "All truth", George says, "[becomes] relative".

Critique of societal expectations
Christopher Bigsby asserts that this play opposes the idea of a perfect American family and societal expectations as it "attacks the false optimism and myopic confidence of modern society". Albee takes a heavy-handed approach to displaying this contrast, making examples of every character and their expectations of the people around them. Societal norms of the 1950s consisted of a nuclear family, two parents and two (or more) children. This conception was picturesque in the idea that the father was the breadwinner, the mother a housewife, and the children well-behaved.

Who's Afraid of Virginia Woolf? smashes these conventions and shows realistic families that are far from perfect and possibly ruined. The families of Honey and Martha were dominated by their fathers, with no sign of a mother figure in their lives. George and Martha's chance at a perfect family was ruined by infertility and George's failure to become a prominent figure at the university.

Inspirations

Title
The play's title, which alludes to the English novelist Virginia Woolf, is also a reference to the song "Who's Afraid of the Big Bad Wolf?" from Walt Disney's animated version of The Three Little Pigs. Because the rights to the Disney song are expensive, most stage versions, and the film, have Martha sing to the tune of "Here We Go Round the Mulberry Bush", a melody that fits the meter fairly well and is in the public domain. In the first few moments of the play, it is revealed that someone sang the song earlier in the evening at a party, although who first sang it (Martha or some other anonymous party guest) remains unclear. Martha repeatedly needles George over whether he found it funny.

Albee described the inspiration for the title:

The title phrase happened to appear five years before the play's premiere, in a 1957 issue of The New Yorker:

The New Yorker responded in 2013 by suggesting that perhaps the graffiti that Albee saw was the same graffiti that The New Yorker reported in 1957.

Characters
In an interview, Albee said Martha and George were based on two of his friends, the married New York socialites Willard Maas and Marie Menken. Maas was a professor of literature at Wagner College and Menken was an experimental filmmaker and painter. Maas and Menken were known for their infamous salons, where drinking would "commence at 4 pm on Friday and end in the wee hours of night on Monday" (according to Gerard Malanga, an Andy Warhol associate and friend to Maas). The primary conflict between George and Martha in Who's Afraid of Virginia Woolf? derived from Maas's and Menken's tempestuous and volatile relationship.

Production history

Original production
Who's Afraid of Virginia Woolf? opened on Broadway at the Billy Rose Theatre on October 13, 1962. The original cast featured Uta Hagen as Martha, Arthur Hill as George, Melinda Dillon as Honey and George Grizzard as Nick. It was directed by Alan Schneider. Subsequent cast members included Henderson Forsythe, Eileen Fulton, Nancy Kelly, Mercedes McCambridge, and Elaine Stritch.

Because of the play's unusual length (over three hours), the producers also cast a matinee company that performed twice a week, featuring Kate Reid as Martha, Shepperd Strudwick as George, Avra Petrides as Honey and Bill Berger as Nick. As with the evening company, these matinee performances also sold out.

The play closed on May 16, 1964, after five previews and 664 performances. It opened in London in 1965, starring Constance Cummings.

Original Broadway cast album
In 1963, Columbia Masterworks released a four-LP (long-playing) boxed recording of the original Broadway cast performing the entire play, directed by Alan Schneider.

The release contained a 16-page booklet with photos from the original production, critical essays by Harold Clurman and Walter Kerr, cast and crew biographies, and a short article by Goddard Lieberson on the task of recording the play. The introduction is by Albee, in which he writes, "I cannot conceive of anyone wanting to buy [this] massive album; but...every playwright wants as much permanence for his work as he can get."

The recording was issued in both stereo (DOS 687) and monaural (DOL 287) formats. It was out of print for many years, was not released in other formats, and is highly prized among collectors, as a play with such adult themes had never been recorded for the general public before. It was finally rereleased in 2014 by Masterworks Broadway.

Notable productions 
In 1970, Henry Fonda and Richard Burton attempted to recruit Warren Beatty and Jon Voight for an all-male production, but Albee refused permission.

Colleen Dewhurst and Ben Gazzara starred in a 1976 Broadway revival.

Mike Nichols and Elaine May starred in a 1980 production in New Haven.

Diana Rigg and David Suchet starred in a 1996 production of the play at the Almeida Theatre in London before transferring to the Aldwych Theatre in London's West End in 1997.

Patrick Stewart and Mercedes Ruehl starred in a 2000-01 production at The Guthrie Theater in Minneapolis.

The play was revived on Broadway at the Longacre Theatre, opening on March 12, 2005, in previews and closing on September 4, 2005, after 177 performances and 8 previews. Directed by Anthony Page, it starred Kathleen Turner as Martha and Bill Irwin as George, with Mireille Enos as Honey and David Harbour as Nick. Irwin won the 2005 Tony Award for Best Performance by a Leading Actor in a Play for his role. The production transferred to London's West End at the Apollo Theatre with the entire original cast, running from January 31 to May 13, 2006. In January 2007, the production played at the Kennedy Center in Washington, D.C., for one month. On February 6, 2007, the production began a six-week run at the Ahmanson Theatre in Los Angeles.  

Notably, it was this 2005 production that led to the publication of a revised script, one that has been used ever since, although many of its revisions were introduced in earlier productions. Among the revisions was the removal of early references to George and Martha's child, as well as the reference to the fact that George felt that he helped cause his parents' death, which was originally the subject of his failed novel. A roughly seven-page scene with George and Honey at the end of Act II has also been removed completely. These and other changes seem to be there to clarify plot points, but arguably rob the play of some of its ambiguity and tenuous relationship with realism.

The play toured in the US and played in San Francisco at the Golden Gate Theatre from April 11 to May 12, 2007.

On December 12, 2010, the Steppenwolf Theatre in Chicago began performances of the play featuring Amy Morton as Martha, Tracy Letts (the Pulitzer Prize-winning playwright of August: Osage County) as George, Carrie Coon, and Madison Dirks. The production was directed by Pam MacKinnon, who previously directed the premieres of Albee's Peter and Jerry and Occupant. This production began previews on Broadway at the Booth Theatre on September 27, 2012, opening on October 13, 50 years after the original Broadway opening. MacKinnon again directed, with the Steppenwolf cast reprising their roles. The production and cast received praise from The New York Times reviewer Charles Isherwood.

Meg Tilly returned to acting in 2011, playing Martha in a production by Blue Bridge Repertory Theatre. The show ran from July 5 to July 17, 2011, in Victoria, British Columbia.

On February 21, 2017, a production directed by James Macdonald began at the Harold Pinter Theatre in London, featuring Imelda Staunton, Conleth Hill, Imogen Poots, and Luke Treadaway. It ran until May 27, 2017.

A Broadway revival was scheduled to premiere on April 9, 2020, in a production directed by Joe Mantello and produced by Scott Rudin. It was canceled due to the COVID-19 pandemic after nine preview performances, without officially opening. It starred Laurie Metcalf, Rupert Everett, Russell Tovey, and Patsy Ferran. Eddie Izzard had been set to play George, but it was announced on September 11, 2019, that Everett would replace him.

Dance interpretation
In 1995 and 1996, the Canadian One Yellow Rabbit troupe mounted a homage in dance to Albee, Permission, in the form of an hourlong ballet inspired by Who's Afraid of Virginia Woolf. It was performed in Calgary, Toronto, Phoenix, Guadalajara, and Mexico City.

Sequels and parodies
In 2018 the Elevator Repair Service premiered a sequel written by Kate Scelsa, titled Everyone's Fine with Virginia Woolf. This play introduces new plot elements such as vampirism.

Awards
Who's Afraid of Virginia Woolf? won both the 1963 Tony Award for Best Play and the 1962–63 New York Drama Critics' Circle Award for Best Play. Its stars won the 1963 Tony Awards for Best Actor and Actress. It was selected for the 1963 Pulitzer Prize for Drama by that award's drama jury, but the award's advisory board—the trustees of Columbia University—objected to its profanity and sexual themes, and overruled the jury, awarding no Pulitzer Prize for Drama in 1963.

The 2012 revival won the 2013 Tony Awards for Best Revival of a Play, Best Performance by an Actor in a Leading Role in a Play (Letts), and Best Direction of a Play (MacKinnon).

Film

A film adaptation of the play was released in 1966. It was directed by Mike Nichols and starred Elizabeth Taylor as Martha, Richard Burton as George, George Segal as Nick and Sandy Dennis as Honey. All four major actors were nominated for Academy Awards: Taylor and Burton for Best Actress and Actor and Dennis and Segal for Supporting Oscars. Both actresses won. Taylor won the Oscar for Best Actress but Burton was passed over that year in favor of Paul Scofield in A Man For All Seasons. Dennis won Best Actress in a Supporting Role.

Jack Valenti identified the film as the first controversial movie he had to deal with as president of the Motion Picture Association of America (MPAA). It was the first to use the slang "screw" and the phrase "hump the hostess". As he said, "In company with the MPAA's general counsel, Louis Nizer, I met with Jack Warner, the legendary chieftain of Warner Bros., and his top aide, Ben Kalmenson. We talked for three hours, and the result was deletion of 'screw' and retention of 'hump the hostess', but I was uneasy over the meeting."

Original film soundtrack album

The film was given a "Deluxe Edition Two-Record Set" soundtrack album release in 1967 by Warner Bros. Records, and was the first film to have its vocals be released in their entirety on an album, as the film at that time could not be shown on network television. It contains the vocals of the four actors performing in the film. The only music on the album is a song, "Virginia Woolf Rock", that plays while Martha and Nick are dancing (but plays a little differently than it does in the film).

In at least two instances alternate takes were used: Taylor's memorable "Goddamn you!" line is restored to "Screw you!", and some of the dialogue from the dancing sequence was lifted from another take. As Martha tells Nick and Honey her story about punching George in the stomach in front of her father, it is heard very clearly while in the film it becomes muffled as the camera follows George into another room to get a gun. The album also ran a half-hour shorter than the movie as most pauses and long silences were removed, but virtually every line remains intact. The album's cover has the four main actors and the back cover has some background information about them, the five-month shooting schedule, and Albee, and a brief synopsis of the film.

Print edition 
The print edition of the play was published in 1962 and was one of the early releases of Atheneum Books. The print edition went on to sell over 70,000 copies in hard and soft cover editions.

References

External links

 
 
 Guardian review of London production 01/02/2006
 Columbia Masterworks 1963 original cast recording

1962 plays
Broadway plays
Grammy Award for Best Spoken Word Album
Literature about alcohol abuse
New England in fiction
American plays adapted into films
Plays by Edward Albee
Tony Award-winning plays
Virginia Woolf in performing arts
Cultural depictions of Virginia Woolf